The men's alpine skiing downhill event was part of the alpine skiing at the 1948 Winter Olympics programme. It was the first appearance of the event and the competition was held on Monday, 2 February 1948.

One hundred and eleven alpine skiers from 25 nations competed. Henri Oreiller of France won the first of his two gold medals at these Olympics; he also won the combined and won a bronze medal in slalom.

Results
This race was also part of the alpine combined.

References

External links
FIS-Ski.com – 1948 Winter Olympics – Men's downhill

 
Olympic.org – 1948 St. Moritz
 Alpine skiing medalists

1948
Men's alpine skiing at the 1948 Winter Olympics